Inuvialuktun (part of Western Canadian Inuit/Inuktitut/Inuktut/Inuktun) comprises several Inuit language varieties spoken in the northern Northwest Territories by Canadian Inuit who call themselves Inuvialuit. Some dialects and sub-dialects are also spoken in Nunavut.

Distribution and varieties 

Inuvialuktun is spoken by the Inuit of the Mackenzie River delta, Banks Island, part of Victoria Island and the Arctic Ocean coast of the Northwest Territories – the lands of the Inuvialuit Settlement Region. It was traditionally subsumed under a broader Inuktitut. Rather than a coherent language, Inuvialuktun is a politically motivated grouping of three quite distinct and separate varieties. It consists of Sallirmiutun (formerly Siglitun; Inuvialuktun proper), the Kangiryuarmiutun dialect of Inuinnaqtun on Victoria Island in the East and the Uummarmiutun dialect of Iñupiaq around Inuvik and Aklavik in the West.

Inuvialuktun, Inuinnaqtun and Inuktitut constitute three of the eleven official languages of the Northwest Territories. Inuinnaqtun is also official alongside Inuktitut in Nunavut.

The Inuvialuktun dialects are seriously endangered, as English has in recent years become the common language of the community. Surveys of Inuktitut usage in the NWT vary, but all agree that usage is not vigorous. According to Statistics Canada's 2016 Census 680 (22%) of the 3,110 Inuvialuit speak any form of Inuktitut, and 550 (18%) use it at home. Considering the large number of non-Inuit living in Inuvialuit areas and the lack of a single common dialect among the already reduced number of speakers, the future of the Inuit language in the NWT appears bleak.

History 
Before the 20th century, the Inuvialuit Settlement Region was primarily inhabited by Siglit Inuit, who spoke Siglitun, but in the second half of the 19th century, their numbers were dramatically reduced by the introduction of new diseases. Inuit from Alaska moved into traditionally Siglit areas in the 1910s and 1920s, enticed in part by renewed demand for furs from the Hudson's Bay Company. These Inuit are called Uummarmiut – which means people of the green trees – in reference to their settlements near the tree line. Originally, there was an intense dislike between the Siglit and the Uummarmiut, but these differences have faded over the years, and the two communities are thoroughly intermixed these days.

Phonology

The phonology of Inuvialuktun and other Inuit languages can be found at Inuit phonology.
 
Most Inuit languages have fifteen consonants and three vowel qualities (with phonemic length distinctions for each). Although Inupiatun and Qawiaraq have retroflex consonants, retroflexes have otherwise disappeared in all the Canadian and Greenlandic dialects.

Writing system 
Inuvialuktun and Inuinnaqtun are written in a Latin alphabet and have no tradition of Inuktitut syllabics. However, the dialects spoken in Nunavut, east of the Inuinnaqtun region use syllabics.

Dialects 
The Inuvialuktun dialects are seriously endangered, as English has in recent years become the common language of the community. Surveys of Inuktitut usage in the NWT vary, but all agree that usage is not vigorous. According to the Inuvialuit Cultural Resource Centre, only 10% of the roughly 4,000 Inuvialuit speak any form of Inuktitut, and only 4% use it at home. Statistics Canada's 2001 Census report is only slightly better, reporting 765 self-identified Inuktitut speakers out of a self-reported Inuvialuit population of 3,905. Considering the large number of non-Inuit living in Inuvialuit areas and the lack of a single common dialect among the already reduced number of speakers, the future of the Inuit language in the NWT appears bleak.

From east to west, the dialects are:

 Iglulingmiut or North Baffin, spoken on western Baffin Island (contrast South Baffin dialect.)
 Aivilingmiutut or Aivilik on the northern Hudson Bay shore of the Kivalliq Region
 Kivallirmiutut or Kivalliq or Caribou on the southern Hudson Bay shore of the Kivalliq Region
 Natsilingmiutut or Netsilik consists of three subdialects: Natsilik proper, Arviligjuaq, Utkuhiksalik
 Inuinnaqtun consists of four subdialects: Kangiryuarmiutun, Kugluktuk, Bathurst, Cambridge. The Kangiryuarmiutun subdialect is spoken in the small community of Ulukhaktok. Essentially the same as Natsilingmiutut.
 Siglitun was, until the 1980s, believed to be extinct, but it is still spoken by people in Paulatuk, Sachs Harbour and Tuktoyaktuk.

The Inuvialuk dialects spoken in Nunavut (that is, Iglulingmiut, Aivilingmiutut, Kivallirmiutut, and eastern Natsilingmiutut) are often counted as Inuktitut, and the government of the NWT only recognizes Inuinnaqtun and Inuvialuktun. In addition, Uummarmiutun, the dialect of the Uummarmiut which is essentially identical to the Inupiatun dialect spoken in Alaska and so considered an Inupiat language, has conventionally been grouped with Inuvialuktun because it's spoken in the Inuvialuit Settlement Region of the NWT. Uummarmiutun is found in the communities of Inuvik and Aklavik.

Example phrases

Notes 

Agglutinative languages
Indigenous languages of the North American Arctic
Inuvialuit languages
Copper Inuit
Endangered Eskaleut languages